Roy Hidemichi Akagi was a Japanese-American scholar and historian.  He was born in Yokohama, Japan in 1892.

Biography 
He studied American History at the University of California, Berkeley, graduating in 1918. He later obtained a master's degree in History from the University of Chicago (1920) and PhD from Harvard. As a professional historian he published a number of books and articles on American history and also about Japan.  In January 1940 he took up the post of the American Representative of the South Manchurian Railway Company, based in New York.  He died in 1943 and was survived by his wife Skiza (born Japan), third daughter of social reformer Abe Isoo, his son Hideya (born Philadelphia) and his daughter Futaba (born New York).

Involvement in the Japanese Students Christian Association

Akagi was involved in a branch of YMCA aimed at Japanese-American Christians. In 1926, he authored a pamphlet for the Japanese Students Christian Association called "The second generation problem: Some suggestions toward its solution." He was listed as "Secretary of YMCA" in a passenger list of a ship from Yokohama in 1929.

Select works 

 The Town Proprietors of the New England Colonies (1924)(reprinted 1963)
 Japanese Civilization: A Syllabus (1927)
 Japan's Foreign Relations, 1542-1936: A Short History (1937)
 Future of American Trade with Manchukuko (1940)
 The Postage Stamps of Manchoukuo(1941)

References 

1892 births
People from Yokohama
Japanese emigrants to the United States
UC Berkeley College of Letters and Science alumni
University of Chicago alumni
Harvard Graduate School of Arts and Sciences alumni
 1943 deaths
People of Manchukuo